RNA-binding protein EWS is a protein that in humans is encoded by the EWSR1 gene on human chromosome 22, specifically 22q12.2. It is one of 3 proteins in the FET protein family. The q22.2 region of chromosome 22 encodes the N-terminal transactivation domain of the EWS protein and that region may become joined to one of several other chromosomes which encode various transcription factors, see and the FET protein family. The expression of a chimeric protein with the EWS transactivation domain fused to the DNA binding region of a transcription factor generates a powerful oncogenic protein causing Ewing sarcoma and other members of the Ewing family of tumors. These translocations can occur due to chromoplexy, a burst of complex chromosomal rearrangements seen in cancer cells.  The normal EWS gene encodes an RNA binding protein closely related to FUS (gene) and TAF15, all of which have been associated to amyotrophic lateral sclerosis.

Interactions 
The EWS protein has been shown to interact with:
 ATF1,
 BARD1, 
 ERG, 
 POU4F1, 
 PTK2B 
 SF1, 
 SNRPC,  and
 ZNF165.

References

Further reading

External links 
 Ewing sarcoma breakpoint region 1 on the Atlas of Genetics and Oncology

Oncogenes